Jin Sha (born 14 March 1981), better known as Kym, is a Chinese singer and actress. She was born in Shanghai and can speak Mandarin, Shanghainese and English.

Career
Kym's career started with a role in the drama Sky in 2003. In the same year, she appeared in A-do's MV. In 2004, she signed with Ocean Butterflies and released her debut album, Air. She has three duets with JJ Lin who was under the same label. She recently appeared as a judge on a singing competition in which the winner would get to collaborate with JJ Lin.

In 2005 the actress started her music career signing under the label Ocean Butterflies in which she would release her debut album entitled "Air", which sold over 200.000 copies in Mainland China. The most popular hit of the album was the song "The summer that wind took away" in which she counted with the collaboration of JJ Lin.

Due to her rising popularity, the actress and performer released a second album that was also well received by the Chinese audience, a great popularity that would soon spread to Taiwan, where her music label released a compilation of her best known songs till that moment. This compilation would be followed, two months later, by the release of her third studio album in the mainland.

In 2008, Jin Sha starred the dramas "The tears of happiness" and "Little romance in the big city" that were both filmed in Xiamen and aired by Xiamen Media Group. She would also sing the opening and image themes for those successful dramas.

In 2009 the actress participated as the leading character in the acclaimed TV series "The Myth· that was directed by Jackie Chan and aired by China Central Television, the national Chinese broadcaster. After the series, Jin Sha released an extended play and started preparing her following studio album, in which she would participate, for the first time, as lyricist and composer. This album would come out one year later with the title of "Legends", that would turn into her very last release under Ocean Butterflies.

From 2011 on, Jin Sha went on developing her music and performing career and she signed with the label TH Entertainment where she would release her following music releases.

Discography

Studio albums

EP's

Filmography

Films

TV series

References

External links 
blog.sina.com.cn/jinsha
kym.youou.com

1981 births
Living people
Actresses from Shanghai
Chinese Mandopop singers
Singers from Shanghai
Chinese television actresses
Chinese film actresses
21st-century Chinese women singers